LakeXpress is the public transportation agency that serves the Lake County, Florida. The service was instituted in 2007 to relieve traffic congestion along U.S. Route 441. Buses operate Monday through Friday and the bureau is currently in the process of transitioning from a flag stop to a designated stop system.

Routes
There are seven scheduled bus routes.
1 Lady Lake to Eustis
1A
2 Leesburg
3 Mount Dora
4 Umatilla to Zellwood, connecting to the Lynx transportation system to Orlando.
50East Mascotte to Winter Garden, connecting to the Lynx transportation system to Orlando.
50West

References

External links
 

Bus transportation in Florida
Transportation in Lake County, Florida
2007 establishments in Florida
RATP Group